22nd Punjab Infantry could refer to two regiments of the British Indian Army

22nd Punjabis in 1861
30th Punjabis in 1857